The Saifi are a Muslim community found in India, Pakistan, Saudi Arabia, Bangladesh, Nepal, Sri Lanka, England.

Saifi may also refer to:

Persons
Amari Saifi (born c. 1956) a.k.a. Abou Haidara or Abderrazak le Para, a leader of the Islamist militia Salafist Group for Preaching and Combat (GSPC)
Euthymios Saifi (1643–1723), Melkite Catholic bishop of Tyre and Sidon
Mohammad Gulzar Saifi (born 1983), Indian educator, and community organizer 
Nadeem Saifi, part of the Indian music production duo Nadeem-Shravan
Rafik Saïfi (born 1975), Algerian football player
Tokia Saïfi (born 1959), French politician and Member of the European Parliament

Others
SAIFI, System Average Interruption Frequency Index, a reliability indicator by electric power utilities
Saifi Village, residential upscale neighbourhood in Beirut, Lebanon.